Yanic-Sonny Wildschut (born 1 November 1991) is a professional footballer who plays as a winger for Oxford United. Born in the Netherlands, he plays for the Suriname national team.

Club career

Zwolle
Born in Amsterdam, Netherlands, Wildschut played for various youth teams, including Volendam and Almere City, before moving to Ajax, where he became a product of the famous academy. Despite having a good year, Wildschut was released when they decided against renewing his contract and joined FC Zwolle in June 2010.

Wildschut made his debut for Zwolle in an Eerste Divisie league match against MVV. The match ended in a goalless draw. He scored his first goal for the club on 29 October 2010, in a 4–0 win over Almere City. A week later, he scored again in the fourth round of the KNVB Cup, though Zwolle would eventually lose in the penalty shootout. As the 2010–11 season progressed, Wildshut scored three more goals against Sparta Rotterdam, and Cambuur twice in different fixtures. In his first season at Zwolle, Wildschut finished the season with thirty-eight appearances and five goals in all competition.

VVV-Venlo
After one season with Zwolle, Wildschut signed a three-year deal with VVV-Venlo on 29 June 2011.

Wildschut made his VVV-Venlo debut playing for 68 minutes of a 0–0 draw against Utrecht in the opening game of the season. He scores his first VVV-Venlo goal on 22 October 2011 in a 4–1 win over RKC Waalwijk. His second goal then came on 20 November 2011, in a 2–1 loss against Groningen. As the 2011–12 season progressed, Wildschut went on to score five more goals, against Excelsior, Groningen, Heracles Almelo, Vitesse and Twente, as he helped the club stay in top-flight football for another season. In his first season at VVV-Venlo, Wildschut made thirty-three appearances and scored four times in all competitions.

Ahead of the 2012–13 season, Wildschut attracted interest from clubs including AZ Alkmaar and Salzburg. Wildschut said that he would like to leave the club to step up to the challenge of a higher level. However, Wildschut stayed at the club and became a first-team regular, making thirty-five appearances and scoring once,  against Utrecht. The club were relegated in the league after finishing in seventeenth place.

Heerenveen
On 24 June 2013, Wildschut signed a three-year deal with SC Heerenveen. He had been linked with a move to the club the previous season and had almost joined the club, but the move collapsed.

Wildschut made his Heerenveen debut in the opening game of the season, playing for 66 minutes before being substituted in a 4–2 loss against AZ. He scored his first goal for the club on 15 September 2013, in a 4–2 win over Groningen. After suffering an injury, he scored on his return, in a 1–1 draw against PSV Eindhoven on 23 November 2013. In six months at Heerenveen, before joining ADO Den Haag, he made eighteen appearances and scoring two times.

ADO Den Haag (loan)
On 31 January 2014, Wildschut was sent on loan to ADO Den Haag until the end of the season. After injuries delayed his debut, he made his first appearance on 15 February 2014, playing for 81 minutes before being substituted, in a 1–0 win over Roda JC. Despite suffering another injury, he went on to make seven appearances for the club.

After his loan spell at ADO Den Haag, Wildschut made four appearances for Heerenveen at the start of the 2014–15 season, including two assists in two matches against Excelsior and Utrecht.

Middlesbrough
On 1 September 2014, Wildschut joined English side Middlesbrough of the Championship on a two-year contract with the option of a further year.

After appearing as an unused substitute for the first three matches of the season, Wildschut made his Middlesbrough debut as a substitute in the League Cup against Liverpool on 23 September 2014. The match went to penalties and Wildschut converted his penalty, but Middlesbrough ultimately lost the shootout. His league debut followed, again as a substitute, in a 0–0 draw against Charlton Athletic on 27 September 2014. He scored his first goal for Middlesbrough in a 3–0 win against Rotherham United on 1 November 2014, and then three days later scored his second goal in a 4–0 win over Norwich City. However, Wildschut struggled to retain his first-team place at Middlesbrough and was restricted to thirteen appearances in his first season. As a result, he spent the rest of the 2014–15 season playing in the club's reserves to regain match fitness.

Wildschut scored his first goal the following season in the first round of the League Cup against Oldham Athletic. A week later on 22 August 2015, he made his first league appearance of the season, playing for 45 minutes in a 1–0 loss against Bristol City. Unable to maintain a first-team place, Wildschut was told by manager Aitor Karanka that he could leave the club on loan to play first-team football.

Wigan Athletic (loan)
On 2 October 2015, Wildschut was sent on loan to Wigan Athletic for three months, until January 2016.

Wildschut made his Wigan debut as a substitute in the second half of a 0–0 draw against Walsall on 3 October 2015. After his debut, Wildschut became a fans' favorite at Wigan Athletic, supporters chanting 'sign him on'. Three days later, on 6 October 2015, he scored his first goal for Wigan, the winner in a 3–2 victory over Crewe Alexandra in the Football League Trophy. Wildschut scored his first league goal for the club on 20 October 2015 in a 3–2 win against Peterborough United. By the end of 2015, Wilschut had scored three more goals, against Blackpool and Barnsley. He signed for Wigan Athletic on a permanent basis on 9 January 2016, Gazette Live reporting the sale fee as £1 million.

Wigan Athletic
Wildschut's first game for Wigan after signing on a permanent basis came on 12 January 2016, where he came on as a substitute in the second half of a 3–3 draw against Sheffield United. Wildschut went on to score five more goals in the 2015–16 season, against Walsall, Colchester United, Shrewsbury Town and Blackpool (twice). After finishing the season with thirty-eight appearances and nine goals in all competitions, having helped Wigan reach promotion to Championship, Wildschut was named in League One's PFA Team of the Year, alongside teammates Craig Morgan, Reece Wabara and Will Grigg.

In the 2016–17 season, Wildschut provided the assist for Alex Gilbey to score the club's first goal on their return to the Championship, in a 2–1 loss against Bristol City in the opening game of the season. Wildschut continued to be a first team-regular until he missed a game for personal reasons. He returned to the first team against Cardiff City on 29 October 2016, starting in a 1–0 win. He started in the 2–1 away win against Huddersfield Town on 28 November 2016, where he set up the opening goal for Reece Burke before scoring Wigan's second goal in a man-of-the-match performance.

Norwich City
On 31 January 2017, Wildschut joined Norwich City for a fee in the region of £7 million. He scored his first goal for Norwich in a 1–1 draw with Bristol City on 7 March 2017.

On 12 January 2018, he joined Cardiff City on loan for the remainder of the 2017–18 season, and was released by Norwich at the end of the 2018–19 season.

Bolton Wanderers (loan)
On 19 July 2018, Wildschut joined Bolton Wanderers on a season-long loan. He made his debut on the opening day of the season, 4 August, coming on as a substitute for Will Buckley against newly relegated West Bromwich Albion and scored in the 89th minute to make it 2–1, winning Bolton the game. Numerous injuries meant he only played 18 matches over the season.

Maccabi Haifa
On 5 July 2019, Wildschut signed for the Israeli Premier League club Maccabi Haifa.

CSKA Sofia
On 26 June 2021, Wildschut signed with Bulgarian A PFG club CSKA Sofia. On 9 December 2021, he scored his first goal for the team in the last minute of a 2–3 home defeat by Roma in a  UEFA Conference League group stage match.

Oxford United
On 22 July 2022, Wildschut signed a two-year deal with EFL League One club Oxford United for an undisclosed fee. He suffered a hamstring injury 15 minutes into his debut in a pre-season friendly and missed the start of the season. On 17 December, he made his league debut for the club in a goalless draw against Sheffield Wednesday.

International career
Born in the Netherlands, Wildschut is of Surinamese descent. He debuted with the Surinamese national team in a friendly 1–0 loss to Thailand on 27 March 2022. Wildschut scored his first international goal for Suriname on 7 June 2022, during a 3–1 loss to Jamaica in the CONCACAF Nations League.

Personal life
Wildschut is married and in late October 2016, he became a father when his wife gave birth to a son.

Career statistics

Club

International

Honours
Wigan Athletic
EFL League One: 2015–16
Cardiff City
EFL Championship runners-up: 2017–18

Maccabi Haifa
 Israeli Premier League: 2020–21

Individual
PFA Team of the Year: 2015–16 League One

References

External links
Voetbal International profile 
Holland stats at OnsOranje 

1991 births
Living people
Footballers from Amsterdam
Surinamese footballers
Suriname international footballers
Dutch footballers
Dutch sportspeople of Surinamese descent
PEC Zwolle players
VVV-Venlo players
SC Heerenveen players
ADO Den Haag players
FC Volendam players
Almere City FC players
Middlesbrough F.C. players
Norwich City F.C. players
Wigan Athletic F.C. players
Cardiff City F.C. players
Bolton Wanderers F.C. players
Maccabi Haifa F.C. players
PFC CSKA Sofia players
Eredivisie players
Eerste Divisie players
English Football League players
Israeli Premier League players
First Professional Football League (Bulgaria) players
Surinamese expatriate footballers
Dutch expatriate footballers
Expatriate footballers in England
Expatriate footballers in Wales
Expatriate footballers in Israel
Dutch expatriate sportspeople in England
Dutch expatriate sportspeople in Wales
Dutch expatriate sportspeople in Israel
Surinamese expatriate sportspeople in England
Surinamese expatriate sportspeople in Wales
Surinamese expatriate sportspeople in Israel
Association football wingers